Leśna Polana  is a village in the administrative district of Gmina Tarczyn, within Piaseczno County, Masovian Voivodeship, in east-central Poland.

The village has a population of 500.

References

Villages in Piaseczno County